Tegafur/uracil is a chemotherapy drug combination used in the treatment of cancer, primarily bowel cancer. It  is also called UFT or UFUR.

Description 
UFT is a first generation dihydropyrimidine dehydrogenase (DPD) inhibitory fluoropyrimidine drug.
It is an oral agent which combines uracil, a competitive inhibitor of DPD, with the 5-fluorouracil (5-FU) prodrug tegafur in a 4:1 molar ratio.

Mechanism of action 
Excess uracil competes with 5-FU for DPD, thus inhibiting 5-FU catabolism.
The tegafur is taken up by the cancer cells and breaks down into 5-FU, a substance that kills tumor cells. The uracil causes higher amounts of 5-FU to stay inside the cells and kill them. Tegafur is a type of antimetabolite. Uracil has also been stated to help protect the gastrointestinal tract from 5-FU toxicity and the related metabolites, with less side effects than 5-FU and other 5-FU related (pro)drugs.  Tetrahydrofuran metabolites from the tegafur metabolism, unique among 5-FU based drugs, have also been shown to improve the antiangiogenic and cytocidal performance of 5-FU, particularly in patients with over-expressed HIF-1.

Trial results 
Trials using UFT for cancer treatment include pancreatic cancer, colorectal cancer, liver cancer, adenocarcinoma of the lung and breast cancer with significant gains over existing treatments, with reduced side effects, improved quality of life, improved disease free survival and/or overall survival.

History
The UFT combination was developed in Japan during the 1980s. UFT is approved in over 50 countries as a cancer therapy, most commonly for advanced colorectal cancer to replace 5FU, and has a low cost. "[P]atients appeared strongly to prefer treatment with [oral] UFT/LV over [intravenous] 5-FU/LV." In Japan, UFT is approved for cancer treatments including tumors of the colon/rectum, lung, breast, stomach, head and neck, liver, gallbladder, bile duct, pancreas, bladder, prostate, and cervix. In the UK, tegafur/uracil with folinic acid is approved as first line treatment by the National Institute for Health and Clinical Excellence (NICE) for metastatic colorectal cancer.

Manufacturing and marketing 
Tegafur/uracil is marketed by companies including Merck Serono, Korea United and Jeil, Taiho, mostly in Asia, Europe, South America, Central America and South Africa.

It is made by various manufacturers and sold under a variety of names including: Tegafur-uracil, UFT, Ftorafur, Tefudex, Ufur and Uftoral. The UFT brand version is authorized for marketing in over 50 countries.  Between 1984 and 2006, over 30 million patients were treated with UFT.

References

External links

Combination drugs
Pyrimidine antagonists
Merck brands